USS John Paul Jones (DDG-53) is the third  guided missile destroyer in the United States Navy and the first ship of the class homeported on the west coast. She is the fifth ship named after American Revolutionary War naval captain John Paul Jones and the second to carry his first name. She was built at Bath Iron Works in Bath, Maine. The ship is part of Destroyer Squadron 9 of Carrier Strike Group 11, which is headed by the nuclear-powered aircraft carrier USS Nimitz (CVN-68).

Description 
John Paul Jones is capable of operating independently, as an element of a coordinated force, or as the nucleus of a surface action group, and to direct and coordinate anti-air, surface, undersea, and strike warfare operations. The ship is named in honor of John Paul Jones and derives her motto from his words: "I wish to have no connection with any ship that does not sail fast, for I intend to go in harm's way."

The ship is equipped with the Aegis combat system and is capable of conducting both offensive and defensive operations using Tomahawk cruise missiles, RGM-84 Harpoon and RIM-66 Standard missiles, CIWS, and  gun. The Arleigh Burke class is the first class of U.S. warships to be fitted with an integrated chemical, biological and radiological defense system.

Service history 
Construction of John Paul Jones began on 8 August 1990, at Bath Iron Works in Bath, Maine. The ship was christened and launched on 26 October 1991.

John Paul Jones was selected as the Shock Trial platform for the DDG-51 class. The ship was subjected to a series of close range explosions in order for the Navy to obtain critical information concerning the survivability of the DDG-51 class in a shock environment. The crew prepared the ship for the most demanding and complex surface ship shock trial test in the history of the Navy. The ship has completed four deployments to the Persian Gulf.

On 7 October 2001, John Paul Jones launched the first Tomahawk missiles into Afghanistan as part of Operation Enduring Freedom.

In June 2010, she began a ten-month yard period during which her machinery control system and many HM&E systems were upgraded.  This was a first in class effort, similar to the CG-47 mid life upgrade undertaken on the  hull.

On 10 June 2011, she anchored off the coast of Malibu, California, at the beginning of a three-day celebration called Navy Days designed to thank the sailors and their families for their service to the country.

On 29 November 2011, John Paul Jones was the first ship to deploy after receiving the DDGMOD (HM&E) upgrade.

On 1 November 2015, John Paul Jones participated in Campaign Fierce Sentry Flight Test Operational-02 Event 2 (FTO-02 E2), a complex $230 million U.S. military missile defense system test event conducted at Wake Island and the surrounding ocean areas. During the test, the destroyer shot down a simulated anti-ship cruise missile but failed to intercept a medium-range ballistic missile that was launched from a C-17 transport plane.

On 18 January 2016, John Paul Jones sank the decommissioned guided-missile frigate  in a test of a new anti-surface warfare variant of the Raytheon Standard Missile 6 (SM-6), becoming the first ship to sink a ship with the new variant of the missile. John Paul Jones fired the missile on the U.S. Pacific Missile Range near Hawaii.

On 3 February 2017, John Paul Jones completed a ballistic missile intercept in a test off the west coast of Hawaii. The test marks the first time that a ballistic missile has been targeted using the Standard Missile-3 (SM-3) Block IIA interceptor.

Awards 

Battle "E" -(1994, 1995, 1997, 2000, 2008, 2013, 2016) 
 Meritorious Unit Commendation - (1-Jan-1999 to 10-Sep-2001), as a part of Enterprise battle group; 15-Jun-1992 to 27-Jun-1994	 
 Captain Edward F. Ney Memorial Award for outstanding food service - (2014)

The ship was also the first to win SWO of the year award.

In popular culture
The ship was featured prominently in the 2012 film Battleship. After the sinking of two other destroyers, including sister ship , she fought alone against the hostile alien fleet. She was later sunk in combat due to severe damage after being specifically targeted by the alien mothership because of the damage she had done to their fleet.

John Paul Jones appeared in 2034: A Novel of the Next World War by Elliot Ackerman and James G. Stavridis. The ship is ambushed and nearly sunk by the Chinese People's Liberation Army Navy in the South China Sea.

The ship also appeared in Tom Clancy's Executive Orders.

References

External links 

 US Navy: USS John Paul Jones Official Website
 

 

Ships built in Bath, Maine
Arleigh Burke-class destroyers
Destroyers of the United States
1991 ships